Joe Arundel (born 22 August 1991) is an English professional rugby league footballer who plays as a  or  forward for Bradford Bulls in the RFL Championship and the England Knights at the International level.

He has played for the Castleford Tigers (Heritage № 891) in the Super League, spending time as a loan from Castleford at Gateshead Thunder in the Co-operative Championship. Arundel moved to Hull F.C. in the top flight, and spent time away from Hull at the York City Knights, Doncaster and Featherstone Rovers in the Championship, and at the Bradford Bulls and the Wakefield Trinity Wildcats in the Super League. A permanent move to Wakefield followed, with loan moves away at the Dewsbury Rams in the 2018 RFL Championship and the Newcastle Thunder in League 1.

Background
Arundel was born in Leeds , West Yorkshire, England.

Career
His amateur club was Castleford Panthers and he has played professionally for the Castleford Tigers, Gateshead Thunder (loan), Hull FC, the York City Knights (loan), Doncaster (loan), the Bradford Bulls (loan), and the Wakefield Trinity (Wildcats) (two spells, the first one on loan) (Heritage № 1352) in the Super League.

Castleford Tigers
Arundel made his debut for the Castleford Tigers in the Super League game against Huddersfield Giants in 2008 Aged 16.

Arundel played in nine games for Castleford in 2010 and impressed scoring 2 tries. He was handed the number 4 jersey for the 2011 season.

Bradford Bulls
On 25 April 2014, Arundel signed for the Bradford Bulls for the rest of the season on loan along with Hull FC teammate Jay Pitts.

A goal kicking Centre, Arundel is excellent in defence and has a tremendous work rate

Halifax Panthers
On 5 Nov 2021 it was reported that he had signed a part-time playing contract with Halifax Panthers in the RFL Championship

References

External links
Wakefield Trinity profile
Castleford Tigers profile

SL profile
Wakefield Trinity’s Joe Arundel targets victory over hometown club Castleford

1991 births
Living people
Bradford Bulls players
Castleford Tigers players
Dewsbury Rams players
Doncaster R.L.F.C. players
England Knights national rugby league team players
English rugby league players
Featherstone Rovers players
Halifax R.L.F.C. players
Hull F.C. players
Newcastle Thunder players
Rugby league centres
Rugby league players from Leeds
Rugby league second-rows
Rugby league wingers
Wakefield Trinity players
York City Knights players